Shaqayeq Rouzbahan (born 6 December 1994) is an Iranian footballer who plays as a midfielder for Kowsar Women Football League club Sepahan SC and the senior Iran women's national team.

International goals

References 

1994 births
Living people
Iranian women's footballers
Iran women's international footballers
Women's association football midfielders
People from Qaem Shahr
Sportspeople from Mazandaran province
21st-century Iranian women